Menegazzia pedicellata is a species of lichen found in Japan that was described as new to science in 2004 by Norwegian lichenologist Jarle Bjerke. It contains caperatic acid.

References

See also
List of Menegazzia species

pedicellata
Lichen species
Lichens described in 2004
Lichens of Japan